Qanat Siah (also Romanized as Qanāt Sīāh, Qanāt-e Sīāh, Qanāt Seyah, and Qanāt Sīyāh; also known as Ghanat Siyah) is a village in Maskun Rural District, Jebalbarez District, Jiroft County, Kerman Province, Iran. At the 2006 census, its population was 39, in 9 families.

References 

Populated places in Jiroft County